Grant Jackson may refer to:

Grant Jackson (baseball) (1942–2021), American baseball player and pitching coach
Grant Jackson (attorney) (1869–1949), American attorney and judge in California